Sindkhed Raja Assembly constituency is one of the 288 constituencies of the Maharashtra Vidhan Sabha and one of the seven which are located in the Buldhana district.

It is a segment of Buldhana Lok Sabha constituency, along with five other Vidhan Sabha (Legislative Assembly) constituencies, namely Buldhana, Chikhali, Mehkar, Khamgaon and Jalgaon (Jamod).

As per orders of Delimitation of Parliamentary and Assembly constituencies Order, 2008, No. 24 Sindkhed Raja Assembly constituency is composed of the following: 
1. Deolgaon Raja Tehsil, 2. Sindkhed Raja Tehsil, 3. Chikhli Tehsil (Part), Revenue Circle - Mera and 4. Lonar Tehsil (Part), Revenue Circle Bibi. of Buldhana district.

Members of Legislative Assembly

See also
 Sindkhed Raja
 Lonar
 Deulgaon Raja

References

Assembly constituencies of Maharashtra